Nye is an unincorporated community in Putnam County, West Virginia, United States.

The community is centered on the confluences of Buzzard Creek and Sycamore Creek with Trace Creek along West Virginia Route 34, to the immediate east of the Lincoln County line.

References

Unincorporated communities in Putnam County, West Virginia
Unincorporated communities in West Virginia
Charleston, West Virginia metropolitan area